Tompkinsville is a neighborhood in northeastern Staten Island in New York City. Named for Daniel D. Tompkins, sixth Vice President of the United States (1817-1825), the neighborhood sits on the island's eastern shore, along the waterfront facing Upper New York Bay, between St. George on the north and Stapleton on the south; however, it is considered part of the North Shore by the island's residents.

History

Early history 

Tompkinsville, located in the Town of Castleton, was the site where early European explorers replenished their fresh water supplies and was known in colonial times as the "Watering Place". It was opposite the Watering Place that the then largest British expeditionary force, with 450 ships and 32,000 soldiers, arrived in Upper New York Bay and landed in advance of the American Revolutionary War. In 1799, the New York state government took  along the waterfront, upon which it established the New York Marine Hospital (also "The Quarantine"), a contagious disease hospital and quarantine station.

In 1815, a settlement was established by New York state governor, Daniel D. Tompkins, in the neighborhood next to the hospital. He was elected Vice President the following year. In 1817 Tompkins built a dock at the foot of present-day Victory Boulevard and began offering steam ferry service to Manhattan. Angry residents burned down the Quarantine in 1858 in a series of attacks known as the Staten Island Quarantine War. Although there were no deaths as a result of the attack, the arsonists completely destroyed the hospital compound.

20th century 

In the early 1900s, the telephone exchange that served Staten Island's eastern North Shore was named after the neighborhood; the name of this exchange was changed to "Saint George" in the mid-1920s, and to "Saint George 7" when New York Telephone upgraded telephone service throughout New York City in December 1930. Converted for All-Number Calling, "727" still exists on the island today. It is the sole surviving number of the designations of the 1920s.

Tompkinsville was the site of a Naval Frontier Base of the US Navy for many years. The base was particularly active during the US engagement with World War I. On 8 July 1919 a delegation consisting of: Vice President Thomas R. Marshall; Josephus Daniels, the Secretary of the Navy; Carter Glass, the Secretary of the Treasury; William B. Wilson, the Secretary of Labor; Newton D. Baker, the Secretary of War; Franklin K. Lane, the Secretary of the Interior; and Senator Champ Clark came aboard the USS Pennsylvania (BB-38) for a cruise back to New York with President Wilson. 

During World War II, it was designated Tompkinsville, SI, New York.

21st century 
In the 21st century, Tompkinsville became a racially mixed area, and a little Sri Lanka had developed. There is also a large population of Italian-Americans, African Americans and Mexicans.  In 2014, black Staten Island resident Eric Garner was killed by police in Tompkinsville, in an incident that received widespread media coverage. 

In 2019, the section of Bay Street in Tompkinsville was rezoned to allow for a higher concentration of residential, commercial, and office space along the street. The plan was controversial, as the vast majority of Staten Island Community Board 1 members had rejected the plan, as did many residents of Tompkinsville, and the commissioners of the New York City Planning Commission had mixed opinions.

Culture 

Tompkinsville contains an enclave of Sri Lankans. The neighborhood also hosts a number of live music and art venues, including Everything Goes Book Café, Deep Tanks Studio, Coyle Cavern, Ink Chyx Tattoo & Art Gallery, and the Staten Island LGBT Community Center, all of which take part in the north shore's monthly Second Saturday art walk. As with much of the north shore, the area is decidedly more urban than is typical of Staten Island, evinced in the architecture (predominantly tall brick buildings) and numerous retail stores and eateries. Unlike many other North Shore communities (and like Port Richmond), the neighborhood has no public housing projects. Its housing stock is dominated by single-family homes built in the first few decades of the 20th century.

Demographics 

The neighborhood is mixed commercial and residential. Like many areas of the northeastern part of the island, it suffered a decline following the construction of the Verrazzano-Narrows Bridge in 1964, which shifted the commercial activity of the island towards its interior. Recent plans have called for the redevelopment of the harbor front area. The population is racially diverse, primarily made up of African-Americans, Hispanics, and Whites, with recent arrivals including immigrants from such countries as Albania. Tompkinsville also contains a Little Sri Lanka, one of the largest Sri Lankan communities outside of the country of Sri Lanka itself. The neighborhood also has a growing Mexican community.

Transportation 

The Tompkinsville station of the Staten Island Railway is one stop south of the terminus at St. George. Unlike at the majority of the railway's stations, a MetroCard or OMNY must be used to enter or exit at Tompkinsville. Faregates were installed at the station in 2009 to deter fare avoiders who would exit at the station to avoid paying the fare at St. George.

References

External links

 Tompkinsville Restoration Project

 
Neighborhoods in Staten Island
1815 establishments in New York (state)
Populated places established in 1815
Albanian-American culture in New York City
Sri Lankan-American culture